Ludwig Marian Kasner (né Ludwik Marian Kaźmierczak; Posen (Poznań), German Empire, October 17, 1896 – February 2, 1959, Berlin-Karlshorst)  was a German policeman of Polish ethnicity  who worked with the Berlin Police. He was the paternal grandfather of German Chancellor Angela Merkel, whose birth name Kasner had been Germanized from Kaźmierczak by Ludwig Kasner in 1930.

In 2013 Ludwig Kasner received media attention in Poland and Germany after a new book shed light on Angela Merkel's family background. This was not only due to Kasner's being of Polish origin, but also because Kasner's nephew had provided a photograph of him in the uniform of the Polish Blue Army (also known as "Haller's Army") which had fought for Poland's independence in the late stages of World War I.

Life
Ludwig Kasner was born out of wedlock to Ludwik Wojciechowski and Anna Kaźmierczak (1867–1943), ethnic Poles and citizens of the German Empire from Posen (now Poznań, Poland). His mother was the daughter of Bartłomiej Kaźmierczak (born 1828) and Apolonia Bielejewicz (1826-1903). The Kaźmierczak name derives from Jan Kaźmierczak, an 18th-century Pole from the Poznań area.

In 1915, during World War I, Ludwig was drafted into the German Army and fought on the western front before being taken prisoner of war in France. He subsequently joined the Polish Blue Army, which fought for Polish independence on the side of the Entente Powers; it is not known whether he took part in fighting against Germany.  With the Blue Army, he returned to Poland to fight in the Polish-Ukrainian War and the Polish-Soviet War.

After returning from war, in the aftermath of the Treaty of Versailles, Ludwig opted for German citizenship and relocated to Berlin, the hometown of his fiancée Marie Margarete Pörschke (August 11, 1905, at Berlin-Kreuzberg - November 9, 1986, at Berlin-Pankow). He worked in the Berlin Police, last in Berlin's Pankow district, and was promoted twice, reaching the rank of Hauptwachtmeister ("chief watch master", the most senior constable rank). In 1926 their son Horst Kaźmierczak was born.

In 1930 the family Germanized their surname from Kaźmierczak to Kasner. They still kept in touch with the Polish side of the family, visiting them in Poznań several times in the 1930s and receiving visits in Berlin from Polish relatives. Despite the surname change, Ludwig Kasner's nephew Zygmunt Rychlicki said Kasner always stayed true to his Polish roots.

Ludwig Kasner was raised a Catholic, but in the 1930s the family converted to Lutheranism, and his son became a Protestant pastor. Ludwig Kasner died on February 3, 1959, at the premises of the Soviet Military Administration in Germany at Berlin-Karlshorst. His occupation after 1945 is unknown.

Even before the 2013 media reports about Ludwig Kasner, Angela Merkel had said in 1995 that one of her grandfathers was originally from Poland; and in 2000 she had reiterated that she was one-quarter Polish.

Ancestry

References

Literature
Stefan Kornelius (2013), Die Kanzlerin und ihre Welt, 

German people of Polish descent
German police officers
Military personnel from Poznań
Angela Merkel
1896 births
1959 deaths
World War I prisoners of war held by France
German prisoners of war in World War I
German Army personnel of World War I
Blue Army (Poland) personnel
Polish people of World War I
Polish people of the Polish–Soviet War
Polish people of the Polish–Ukrainian War
Converts to Lutheranism from Roman Catholicism